Geoffrey Raymond is an American painter.

Geoffrey Raymond (or similar) may also refer to:

Geoffrey Raymond, character in Alibi (play)
Geoff Raymond, broadcaster, see Brian Naylor (broadcaster) 
Jeff Raymond, co-writer of You Don't Love Me Anymore (Eddie Rabbitt song)